Don Li Yat-long is a Hong Kong singer and actor of the Emperor Entertainment Group, Music Icon Records. Don Li was a finalist in Talent Show 2002 in Hong Kong. In 2003, he began his career in the entertainment industry by acting in television series. In 2005, Li and Mandy Chiang began their music careers as a duet couple. In January 2007, Chiang announced that she and Li will both continue their music careers as solo artists.

Since 2009, the Hong Kong singer/actor has been actively pursuing an acting career in the Mainland, with a recent television idol drama hit Zhang Xiao Wu De Chun Tian (张小五的春天). On 14 July 2010, Don released his much anticipated new Mandarin EP titled For My Dearest, in which Don has personally involved in much of the production of this new album, from selection of songs and style, to cover design and music video direction. This EP features five songs of single-word titles elucidating the different stages of a romantic relationship, infatuation, separation, reunion, and finally enlightenment. The EP also includes a bonus DVD containing three music videos, one of which features Vincy Chan and Yumiko Cheng.

Television Series
Hearts Of Fencing (2003)
A Handful Of Love (2004)
Sunshine Heartbeat (2004)
Ten Brothers (2005)
Da Tang Nü Xun An (2011)
Elite Brigade III (2015)

Filmography
 Dating Death (2004) 
 Moments of Love (2005) 
 Yarudora (2005) 
 Rob-B-Hood (2006) 
 The Haunted School (2007) 
 Dancing Lion (2007) 
 Whispers and Moans (2007)
 Bloody Doll (2014)
 Little Big Master (2015)
 Port of Call (2015)
 We Are Legends (2019)
 Iron Wall Fist (2019)

Discography
Don Li – The Single (2003)
Don & Mandy (2005)
Don & Mandy – Rainy Lover (2006)
Don & Mandy – Winter Lover (2006)
Don Li – 李威樂 (2007)
Don Li – For My Dearest (2010)
CD
01. 倆
02. 零
03. 誰
04. 悟
05. 快
06. 誰 (粵語)
DVD
01. 零
02. 誰
03. 倆

Theme Song
The Winter Melon Tale (TVB)-Chris Lai and Don Li (2009)

References

External links
Don Li's official site (Chinese)
Talent Show 2002 第一屆香港藝能大展
Don Li's official blog on Sina
Don Li's official blog on Yahoo(integrated to sina blog)

1982 births
Living people
Cantopop artists
Hong Kong male film actors
Hong Kong male singers
Hong Kong Mandopop singers
Hong Kong male television actors
People from Zhaoqing
TVB actors
21st-century Hong Kong male actors